Andrew Miller (born 1974 in London) is a British journalist and author.

Miller studied literature at Cambridge and Princeton.

He worked as a television producer before joining The Economist to write about British politics and culture. In 2004 he was appointed The Economist's Moscow correspondent, and covered, among other things, the Orange Revolution in Ukraine. He returned to the UK in 2007 and took over as The Economist'''s British political editor. From then until July 2010 he wrote the magazine's Bagehot column.

In 2006, he wrote The Earl of Petticoat Lane, a family memoir about "immigration, class, the Blitz, love, memory and the underwear industry." In the New Statesman, Linda Grant described the book as "the best-documented account of the class trajectory of British Jewry in the 20th century". Miller's novel Snowdrops'', set in Russia, was shortlisted for the Man Booker Prize in 2011.

References

1974 births
Alumni of the University of Cambridge
Living people
English male journalists
Princeton University alumni